Podgorica is the capital and largest city of Montenegro.

Podgorica (Cyrillic: Подгорица) may also refer to:
Podgorica Capital City
Podgorica Airport, an airport on territory of the Podgorica Capital City

Places

Slovenia
Podgorica, Dobrepolje, a village in the municipality of Dobrepolje
Podgorica, Sevnica, a village in the municipality of Sevnica
Podgorica pri Pečah, a village in the municipality of Moravče
Podgorica pri Podtaboru, a village in the municipality of Grosuplje
Podgorica pri Šmarju, a village in the municipality of Grosuplje
Podgorica pri Črnučah, a locality of Ljubljana

Serbia / Kosovo

See also
, a village in the municipality of Targovishte, Bulgaria
Podgorač, a village and a municipality in Osijek-Baranja County, Croatia
Podgorac (disambiguation)
Podgorci (disambiguation)
, a village in the municipality of Vitina, Serbia / Kosovo